Lobaunia is a genus of minute freshwater spring snails, aquatic gastropod mollusks or micromollusks in the family Hydrobiidae.

Species 
The genus Lobaunia contains the following species:
 Lobaunia danubialis

References 

 Nomenclator Zoologicus info

 
Hydrobiidae
Taxonomy articles created by Polbot